Iran–Ukraine relations are the bilateral relations between Iran and Ukraine. Iran has an embassy in Kyiv and Ukraine has an embassy in Tehran. Prior to 2020, the relationship between the Islamic Republic of Iran and Ukraine was strong but has since deteriorated due to Iran supplying its Shahed military drones to Russia during the 2022 Russian invasion of Ukraine as well as the downing of Ukraine International Airlines Flight 752 by Iran's Islamic Revolutionary Guard Corps in 2020.

History
On 25 December 1991, Iran officially recognized the independence of Ukraine. Diplomatic relations between Ukraine and Iran were established on 22 January 1992 with the signing of the 'Protocol on the Establishment of Diplomatic Relations between Ukraine and the Islamic Republic of Iran'. In January 1992, the Embassy of Iran in Kyiv began operations and in October of the same year, the Embassy of Ukraine in Tehran also began its operations.

From 25 April to April 26, 1992, at the invitation of the President of Iran Akbar Hashemi-Rafsanjani, President of Ukraine Leonid Kravchuk paid a visit to Iran, where both the leaders signed the 'Declaration on the Principles of Friendly Cooperation between Ukraine and Islamic Republic of Iran'. The declaration stated that both countries will develop their relations as friendly states and equal partners, while being guided by the principles of respect for the sovereignty of both countries, the inviolability of borders, territorial integrity and non-interference in each other's internal affairs.

Iran does not recognize the 2014 Russian annexation of Crimea and considers Crimea an integral part of Ukraine. In 2016, a meeting of the Ukrainian-Iranian joint commission on trade and economic cooperation was held for the first time. A mechanism was launched to simplify the procedure for obtaining Ukrainian visas by Iranian citizens. On the same year, the visit of the Minister of Energy and Coal Industry of Ukraine Ihor Nasalyk to Iran contributed to the agreements on the transit of Iranian energy carriers to the European Union through the territory of Ukraine. The mechanism of political consultations at the level of deputy foreign ministers of both states was resumed.

On 8 January 2020, the Iranian military accidentally shot down Ukraine International Airlines Flight 752, straining relations between the two countries. On 11 January, the President of Ukraine Volodymyr Zelenskyy called on the Iranian government to bring those responsible for the plane crash to justice and to discuss the issue of compensation. On 20 January 2020, an Iranian delegation headed by the special envoy of the President of Iran, Minister of Roads and Urban Development Mohammad Eslami arrived in Kyiv, where he met with Foreign Minister of Ukraine Vadym Prystaiko. The parties spoke about the need for a comprehensive and objective investigation of the shootdown of Flight 752.

2022 Russian invasion of Ukraine

On 24 February 2022, Russia invaded Ukraine in a major escalation of the Russo-Ukrainian War that began in 2014. On 2 March, Iran abstained in the United Nations General Assembly Resolution ES-11/1 which deplored Russia's invasion and demanded a full withdrawal of Russian forces and on 7 April, voted against United Nations General Assembly Resolution ES-11/3 which suspended the membership of Russia in the United Nations Human Rights Council.

During a visit to Tehran in July 2022, Vladimir Putin received staunch support from Iran over his invasion of Ukraine, with the Supreme Leader Ali Khamenei saying that if Russia had not sent troops into Ukraine, it would have faced an attack from NATO later, echoing Putin’s own rhetoric.

Despite official statements in July 2022 that Iran would not supply Russia or Ukraine with military equipment during the war and downplaying the United States' assessment that Iran was preparing to transfer combat drones to Russia, Iranian-supplied suicide drones were being used by Russia against Ukraine from September 2022. On 23 September 2022 Ukraine revoked the accreditation of the Iranian ambassador to Ukraine Manouchehr Moradi and decided to reduce Iran's diplomatic presence in Ukraine to protest Iran's drone deliveries to Russia, calling it an "unfriendly act that deals a serious blow to relations between Ukraine and Iran".

Despite blaming NATO and the United States for instigating the war, the Iranian government called for a political solution to the conflict. However, many Iranians protested against the Russian invasion and criticised the government's stance in the conflict, resulting in a massive debate in Iran regarding the invasion. On 27 February 2022, a group of Iranians assembled outside of the Ukrainian Embassy in Tehran on Saturday to protest the Russian invasion, where they chanted "Death to Putin", until they were dispersed by the police. On 26 February, the Iranian conservative newspaper Kayhan published an editorial in response to the invasion stating that in the past decades the United States has abandoned several of its allies after pushing them into crises, while an editorial by Jomhouri-e Eslami stated that the stances declared by Iranian officials about the invasion contradict the principles of Iran, and demanded that they clearly condemn Russia's warmongering and to settle disputes via dialogue. The contradictory views expressed by two newspapers published by the office of the Supreme Leader of Iran Ali Khamenei suggest that Khamenei is trying to balance the government's stances toward the Ukrainian crisis.

Iranian politicians such as reformist Sadegh Zibakalam, former presidents Mahmoud Ahmadinejad and Mohammad Khatami and diplomat Seyed Hossein Mousavian have condemned the invasion and offered support to Ukraine. Iranian film actor Hamid Farrokhnezhad, who is well known for his role in the 2006 movie Fireworks Wednesday, posted a video which was widely circulated via social media where he denounced the Russian invasion of Ukraine in social media as "brutal attack". In the video, he also stated that he returned the best actor award he received from the Moscow Film Festival in 2005 for his role in the 2004 anti-war drama film Big Drum Under Left Foot to protest the invasion. Actor Babak Karimi compared the Russian invasion to the 1980 Iraqi invasion of Iran, which sparked the Iran–Iraq War.

Due to the fact that the Islamic Republic of Iran, despite its official neutral stance, is supplying Russia with drones that are used for attacks in Ukraine, Ukraine's president Zelensky announced in September 2022 that the accreditation of the Iranian ambassador will be revoked and the number of diplomatic staff of the Iranian embassy in Kyiv significantly reduced. Dmytro Kuleba, Minister of Foreign Affairs of Ukraine, has also suggested to Volodymyr Zelenskyy to break formal relations with Iran; this is because of recent attacks on Ukrainian territory with drones made in Iran.

See also 

 Foreign relations of Iran
 Foreign relations of Ukraine
 Ukraine International Airlines Flight 752
 Iran–Russia relations

References 

 
Ukraine
Iran